Ernest Alexander (1870–1934) was a VC recipient.

Ernest or Ernie Alexander may also refer to:

Ernest Alexander (politician) (1872–1946), English politician
Ernie Alexander (actor) in Find the Witness etc.
Ernie Alexander, creator of National Bicycle Association

See also